Norvell may refer to:

 Congo Norvell, musical group
 Norvell (name)
 Norvell House, Seattle, Washington
 Norvell Township, Michigan
 USCGC Margaret Norvell, ship